The episodes from the anime television series  are based on the Gin Tama manga by Hideaki Sorachi. The series premiered on January 7, 2018. It is a sequel to the Gintama. Porori-hen anime series which aired and ended in 2017.

The first opening theme is "Katte ni my Soul" by DISH// and the ending theme is "Hana Ichi Monme" by Burnout Syndromes. The second opening theme is "I Wanna Be..." by SPYAIR and the ending theme is "Hikari Shoumeiron" by CHiCO with HoneyWorks.



Episode list

References

. Shirogane no Tamashii-hen